Kikawa Dam is a gravity dam located in Yamagata Prefecture in Japan. The dam is used for power production. The catchment area of the dam is 82.7 km2. The dam impounds about 9  ha of land when full and can store 840 thousand cubic meters of water. The construction of the dam was started on 1956 and completed in 1958.

References

Dams in Yamagata Prefecture
1958 establishments in Japan